Mill Brook may refer to:

United Kingdom
Mill Brook, Shropshire, a tributary of the River Rea, Shropshire in England

United States
Mill Brook (Swift River tributary), a tributary of the Swift River in New Hampshire
First River, formerly known as Mill Brook, a tributary of the Passaic River in New Jersey
Mill Brook (Pepacton Reservoir tributary), a river in Delaware and Ulster Counties, New York
Mill Brook (Unadilla River tributary), a river in Chenango County, New York
Mill Brook (West Canada Creek tributary), a river in Herkimer County, New York
Mill Brook community, historic community in Vermont

See also
Mill Creek (disambiguation)
Millbrook (disambiguation)